Silvester Ashioya (born 11 June 1948) is a Kenyan field hockey player. He competed in the men's tournament at the 1972 Summer Olympics.

References

External links
 

1948 births
Living people
Kenyan male field hockey players
Olympic field hockey players of Kenya
Field hockey players at the 1972 Summer Olympics
Place of birth missing (living people)
20th-century Kenyan people